Behzadabad (also Romanized as Behzādābād; also known as Beyzābād, Bezābād, and Bīzābād) is a village in Chalanchulan Rural District, Silakhor District, Dorud County, Lorestan Province, Iran. At the 2006 census, its population was 276, in 63 families.

References 

Towns and villages in Dorud County